Lake Buluan is a lake located in the island of Mindanao in the Philippines.

The lake is sandwiched between the provinces of Maguindanao and Sultan Kudarat. The lake falls under the political jurisdiction of the municipalities of Buluan and Mangudadatu of Maguindanao and President Quirino and Lutayan in Sultan Kudarat.

The lake actually consists of adjoining marshy basins of the Pulangi, Maanoy, Buluan, Alah rivers, which are all tributaries of the Mindanao River.

History 
This lake was formerly surrounded by the Sultanate of Buayan before the American era.

Species of Fish
The following species of fishes are found in the lake:
 Climbing gourami (Anabas testudineus)
 Snakehead murrel (Channa striata)
 Milkfish (Chanos chanos)
 Walking catfish (Clarias batrachus)
 Common carp (Cyprinus carpio carpio)
 Sundari bele (Glossogobius giuris)
 Mozambique tilapia (Oreochromis mossambicus)
 Spotte barb or common barb (Puntius binotatus)
 Snakeskin gourami (Trichopodus pectoralis)

Environmental Concerns
Mining operations in the nearby provinces of South Cotabato and Davao del Sur as well as Sultan Kudarat poses a threat to the lake habitat.

See also
List of protected areas of the Philippines

References

External links
 

Buluan
Game refuge and bird sanctuaries of the Philippines
Landforms of Sultan Kudarat
Landforms of Maguindanao del Sur